Alana Maria King (born 22 November 1995) is an Australian cricketer who plays for Western Australia in the Women's National Cricket League (WNCL) and the Perth Scorchers in the Women's Big Bash League (WBBL). An all-rounder, she bowls right-arm leg spin and bats right-handed. She previously played for Victoria and Melbourne Stars. King is of Anglo-Indian descent, her parents both having emigrated from Chennai to Melbourne.

Early life 
King followed her brother's footsteps by pursuing an interest in cricket after trying out different sports such as tennis, softball and baseball. Tennis was her first sport of choice as she took up the tennis racquet at the tender age of five and competed in the Tennis Victoria Pennant which was the largest tennis inter-club representative competition in Australia. She also served as a ball kid during the women's singles final of the 2011 Australian Open. She also had a brief stint with her school softball team and also turned up for Monash University Baseball Club.

Domestic career 

King was handed her first rookie contract at the age of 16 in 2012 with VicSpirit in the Women's National Cricket League and three years later down the line, she bagged a surprise call-up to Melbourne Stars for the inaugural edition of the WBBL in 2015–2016 season. She leapfrogged into the senior Victoria squad in 2016.

She also had a successful 2021–22 Women's Big Bash League season by emerging as the joint fifth highest wicket-taker in the season with 16 scalps.

In April 2022, King was bought by the Trent Rockets for the 2022 season of The Hundred in England. On 13 August 2022, during a group stage match between Trent Rockets and Manchester Originals, she claimed a hat-trick against Manchester Originals and became the first woman to take a hat-trick in The Hundred.

In the same month, during a group stage match between Oval Invincibles and Trent Rockets at the 2022 Hundred edition, King achieved a unique feat by delivering 10 consecutive dot balls to become the first player to achieve the milestone in the history of The Hundred.

International career 
In April 2019, Cricket Australia awarded her with a contract with the National Performance Squad ahead of the 2019–20 season.

In January 2022, King was named in Australia's squad for their series against England to contest the Women's Ashes. She was included in Ashes squad as replacement to injured Georgia Wareham and Sophie Molineux but she was picked up in the squad over Amanda-Jade Wellington as a surprise package with selectors opted to leave out Amanda-Jade Wellington in order to allow her play for Australia A team. She made her Women's Twenty20 International (WT20I) debut on 20 January 2022, for Australia against England. Later the same month, she was named in Australia's team for the 2022 Women's Cricket World Cup in New Zealand.

She made her Women's Test match debut on 27 January 2022, for Australia against England in the one-off Women's Ashes Test. She made her Women's One Day International (WODI) debut on 3 February 2022, also for Australia against England in the Women's Ashes. Therefore, she earned her first cap in all three formats of international cricket in the space of fourteen days. In April 2022, she received her first contract with Cricket Australia after her splendid performances with the ball throughout the cricket summer.

She was the second highest wicket-taker for Australia during the successful 2022 World Cup campaign for the Aussies as she picked up 12 wickets in the tournament at 24.50 in nine matches including a spell of 3 for 64 against England in the all important final. She was also the fourth joint highest wicket-taker during the tournament in what is considered to be a career defining performance for her which would later make her first-choice player in the Australian team.

In May 2022, King was named in Australia's team for the cricket tournament at the 2022 Commonwealth Games in Birmingham, England.

References

External links

Alana King at Cricket Australia

1995 births
Living people
Cricketers from Melbourne
Australian expatriate cricketers in the United Kingdom
Australian people of Anglo-Indian descent
Australian sportspeople of Indian descent
Anglo-Indian people
Australian women cricketers
Australia women Test cricketers
Australia women One Day International cricketers
Australia women Twenty20 International cricketers
Melbourne Stars (WBBL) cricketers
Sportswomen from Victoria (Australia)
Victoria women cricketers
Western Australia women cricketers
Perth Scorchers (WBBL) cricketers
IPL Supernovas cricketers
Cricketers at the 2022 Commonwealth Games
Commonwealth Games gold medallists for Australia
Commonwealth Games medallists in cricket
Trent Rockets cricketers
20th-century Australian women
21st-century Australian women
People from the City of Kingston (Victoria)
Medallists at the 2022 Commonwealth Games